was a Japanese speed skater who competed in the 1992 Winter Olympics and the 1994 Winter Olympics.

Speedskating career
Born in Katsushika, Tokyo, Miyabe moved to Kushiro when he was 5 years old, and started speedskating. He then moved to Saitama prefecture in the first year of Junior High school and joined Sankyo Seiki.

At the 1992 Winter Olympics, he won the bronze medal in the 1000 metres event. In the 1500 m competition he finished ninth and in the 500 m contest he finished 18th.

Two years later he finished 14th in the 1000 metres event and 21st in the 1500 metres competition.

He ended up winning the overall classification of the ISU Speed Skating World Cup 1000 m in the 1994/1995 season.

Retirement
After retiring from the 1999/2000 season, he retired at Ohio State University postgraduate school by JOC's overseas dispatch business and majored in sports management. In 2005 he returned to JOC staff.

Personal life
He was the younger brother of Yasunori Miyabe. Yukinori died of cancer in March 2017.

References

External links
 SportsReference profile

1968 births
2017 deaths
Japanese male speed skaters
Speed skaters at the 1992 Winter Olympics
Speed skaters at the 1994 Winter Olympics
Olympic speed skaters of Japan
Medalists at the 1992 Winter Olympics
Olympic medalists in speed skating
Olympic bronze medalists for Japan
Deaths from cancer in Japan